Doncho Atanasov (born on 2 April 1983) is a former Bulgarian footballer, who played as a left winger.

Career
Doncho Atanasov came from the youth system of Beroe Stara Zagora, and was called up to the first team squad for the 2001–02 season. On 9 February 2002, he made his A PFG debut as he replaced Krum Bibishkov in the 69th minute of their 0–2 home loss against Litex Lovech. He only made 11 appearances for Beroe's first team before moving to Armeets Sliven in June 2002. On 19 July 2014, Atanasov scored the only goal in Haskovo's 1:0 victory over reigning A PFG champions Ludogorets Razgrad to provide his team with a winning start in the new league season.

Atanasov played for Botev Galabovo one season before being released in June 2017. On 1 September 2017, he announced his retirement as footballer.

Honours

Club
Beroe
Bulgarian Cup (2): 2009–10, 2012–13
Bulgarian Supercup: 2013

References

Bulgarian footballers
1983 births
Living people
Sportspeople from Stara Zagora
PFC Beroe Stara Zagora players
PFC Cherno More Varna players
FC Lyubimets players
FC Haskovo players
Limanovia Limanowa players
FC Vereya players
FC Botev Galabovo players
First Professional Football League (Bulgaria) players
Second Professional Football League (Bulgaria) players
Bulgarian expatriate footballers
Bulgarian expatriate sportspeople in Poland
Expatriate footballers in Poland

Association football wingers